Ari Berk is an American writer, folklorist, artist, and scholar of literature, iconography, and comparative myth. Berk holds degrees in Ancient History (B.A.), American Indian Studies (M.A.), and Comparative Literature and Culture (Ph.D.) from Humboldt State University and University of Arizona respectively. His dissertation was directed by Pulitzer Prize winner N. Scott Momaday and Berk was appointed to the committee that developed the first American Indian Studies doctoral program in the United States.

Berk is the author of numerous books for children and adults. He collaborated with fairy artist Brian Froud on The Runes of Elfland and Goblins!, and was one of the authors of the Lady Cottington series, along with Terry Jones, and others. Berk began his interactive Secret History children's mythology series in the mid-2000s with The Secret History of Giants, and followed this volume with The Secret History of Mermaids and Merfolk, and The Secret History of Hobgoblins. The Secret History of Giants won both a 2008 Recommended Parents' Choice Award and a 2009 Notable Award from The National Council of Teachers of English.

He is a professor of English at Central Michigan University and teaches mythology, folklore, American Indian studies, and medieval literature. Berk is the former editor of the Folksroots section of Realms of Fantasy magazine. He also sits on the board of directors of the Mythic Imagination Institute. Berk often says that Evelyn B., daughter of his dear friend, is the greatest influence of his life. Born and raised in California, he now lives in Michigan with his wife and son.

Awards 

 The Secret History of Giants: Recommended Award 2008, Parents' Choice Award.
 The Secret History of Giants: Notable Award 2009, The National Council of Teachers of English.
 William Shakespeare: His Life and Times: Children's Choice Award 2010, School Library Association.

Bibliography

Books 
 Undertaken Trilogy: Lych Way (2014), Simon & Schuster
 Undertaken Trilogy: Mistle Child (2013), Simon & Schuster
 Undertaken Trilogy: Death Watch (2011), Simon & Schuster
 Nightsong (2012), Simon and Schuster
 The Secret History of Hobgoblins (2010), Templar Books
 William Shakespeare: His Life and Times (2010), Templar Books
 The Secret History of Mermaids and Merfolk (2009), Templar Books
 How To Be A Viking (2008), Templar Books
 Coyote Speaks (2008), Abrams Books
 The Secret History of Giants (2008), Templar Books
 Lady Cottington's Pressed Fairy Letters (2005), Abrams Books
 Goblins! (2004), Abrams Books
 The Runes of Elfland (2003), Abrams Books

Magazine articles 
 Back Over the Wall - Charles Vess Revisits the World of Stardust (2007), Realms of Fantasy
 The Lore of Simple Things - Milk, Honey, and Bread in Myth and Legend (2005), Realms of Fantasy
 The Dance of the Labryrinth (2004), Realms of Fantasy
 The Song of the Sampo - Mystery and the Numinous in the Kalevala (2004), Realms of Fantasy
 Where the White Stag Runs - Boundary and Transformation in Deer Myths (2003), Realms of Fantasy
 Penance, Power and Pursuit - On the Trail of the Wild Hunt (2002), Realms of Fantasy
 A Rune With A View: An Introduction To The Visionary Alphabet of the Northern World (2002), Realms of Fantasy
 Of Travels and Travails - Imagination, Landscape and Narrative (2001), Language Arts Journal of Michigan

Poems 
 Anatomy, Winter Finds the World on Fire, Rings, A Rune of Loss, Night Thoughts (2007), Creative Journal VII
 Night Thoughts: Sheherazade (2001), Endicott Studio Online Journal
 Anatomies (2001), The Quest for the Green Man
 Bag of Medicine and Wind (1999), Endicott Studio Online Journal
 Paserik Burial (1998), Endicott Studio Online Journal

Screenplays 
 Lanval (2009), Shared Legends Project

Short stories 
 Missing Limb (2009), Ravens In The Library

References

External links

 Ari Berk's Official Web Site
 The Undertaken Trilogy
Book Spotlight of Death Watch on The Bearded Scribe

1967 births
Living people
21st-century American novelists
American children's writers
American columnists
American fantasy writers
American folklorists
American male novelists
American male screenwriters
California State Polytechnic University, Humboldt alumni
University of Arizona alumni
Novelists from Michigan
American male short story writers
21st-century American short story writers
21st-century American male writers
21st-century American non-fiction writers
American male non-fiction writers
Screenwriters from California
Screenwriters from Michigan
Screenwriters from Arizona
21st-century American screenwriters